Stockbridge was a parliamentary borough in Hampshire, which elected two Members of Parliament (MPs) to the House of Commons from 1563 until 1832, when the borough was abolished by the Great Reform Act. It was one of the more egregiously rotten boroughs, and the first to have its status threatened for its corruption by a parliamentary bill to disfranchise it, though the proposal was defeated.

History

Early years
The borough was first enfranchised during the reign of Elizabeth I, and consisted of the town of Stockbridge, a small Hampshire market town on the Great South-West Road that cannot have been a town of any real size or importance even at the outset. Although in Hampshire, in Tudor times the borough came within the jurisdiction of the Duchy of Lancaster, and it is possible that it won its right to vote on the assumption that it would allow the Duchy to nominate its members. However - and unlike most boroughs within the Duchy's sphere at that period - the historian John Neale found little evidence that most of early representatives were Duchy nominees: most were Hampshire men, and it may be that the influence of the local gentry was too strong. Nevertheless, towards the end of Queen Elizabeth's reign Stockbridge returned several MPs who were probably the choices of the Chancellor of the Duchy.

The election of 1614
The system came to grief, however, at the election of 1614, causing a controversy that has been regarded as a significant milestone in the House Of Commons' assertion of its privileges. In that year, the Chancellor of the Duchy of Lancaster, Sir Thomas Parry, sent a threatening letter to the borough claiming the right by precedent to choose the two MPs, and nominating Sir Henry Wallop and Sir Walter Cope as his choices. But the intrepid 28 electors of Stockbridge ignored his wishes, voting almost unanimously for their own candidates, Sir Richard Gifford and a Mr St John. But the bailiff of the borough (who was ex-officio returning officer) ignored the vote and returned the names of Wallop and Cope as elected; furthermore, the angry Parry, furious to have been defied, had one of the voters arrested and imprisoned.

The electors now petitioned against this outcome, and the House of Commons proved strong enough to protect its elections from interference. Although there was considerable discussion as to the legal precedents, they eventually resolved that the election of Wallop and Cope was void. Furthermore, they expelled Parry from his own seat for subverting the election in another constituency, and prevailed upon the King to suspend him from his office and from the Privy Council.

17th century attempts to disfranchise Stockbridge for corruption
It is not recorded whether the stand of the Stockbridge electors was based on principle or had some less worthy motive, but their successors were certainly more venal. At least from the late 17th century, the right to vote in Stockbridge was exercised by all inhabitant householders who paid scot and lot, which generally amounted to about 100 voters. Bribery was routine, and led to frequent scandal. In 1689 and again in 1693, the election in the borough was declared void. After the 1689 election was overturned by the Commons for "gross and notorious bribery", its original victor debarred from being re-elected for the constituency in that Parliament, and the bailiff and three other inhabitants of the town were thrown in jail. Then an unprecedented motion was put to disfranchise Stockbridge, and transfer its two seats to the county, but the other MPs - perhaps nervous as to their own position - proved unenthusiastic. After debate the proposal was quietly dropped.

In 1693, very unusually, the House went against the findings of its own election committee, declaring the election corrupt and void even though the committee had decided that the winner had been duly elected. Instead of issuing a writ for a new election, the House then considered a bill to disfranchise Stockbridge; this time the bill made considerable progress, but it was eventually defeated on the third reading and a by-election was held to fill the vacancy. 
 
Not all the bribery in Stockbridge was as direct as buying votes or corrupting the bailiff. Thomas Oldfield, the 19th century historian of and polemicist against electoral abuse, records the following anecdote of the author Richard Steele, elected in 1713:
<blockquote>The ingenious Sir Richard Steele ... carried his election against a powerful opposition, by the merry expedient of sticking a large apple full of guineas, and declaring it should be the prize of that man whose wife should first be brought to-bed [i.e. have a baby] after that day nine months. This, we are told, procured him the interest of the women, who are said to commemorate Sir Richard's bounty to this day, and once made a strenuous effort to procure a resolution, that no man should ever be received as a candidate who did not offer himself upon the same terms.</blockquote>

Patronage in the 18th and 19th centuries
Yet despite the apparent need to secure every result by bribery, Stockbridge continued to have a generally recognised "patron", without whose support it was considered difficult if not impossible to be elected, and despite the precarious hold that this patronage entailed, it was as much a commercial  property as the ownership of pocket boroughs where control of the elections was absolute. In 1754, the patron was the attorney-general, Robert Henley, who had personal rather than government-backed influence over the borough. He passed control to his colleague Henry Fox by leasing the rights for a term of years. Fox hoped to reduce the venality of the voters but quickly saw a deterioration rather than an improvement, and must have considered his payment to have been a poor investment. Namier and Brooke quote correspondence to show that in 1767 Fox's son, the Whig leader Charles James Fox, was admitting that while they felt certain of securing one seat for their chosen candidate at the following year's election they saw little likelihood of being able to choose both MPs: the 96 voters had already been bribed in advance to the extent of 50 guineas a man, and if the election was carried to a contest the need for further treating of the voters and payments to the returning officer would bring the cost to a candidate into the region of £2,500. (In the event this election was not contested, presumably because the votes bought in advance had already made it a foregone conclusion; but there were contests at each of the next four opportunities.)

By 1774 the younger Fox was in need of money and no longer able to afford the expense of maintaining control of Stockbridge's elections. Yet it seems that he was able to sell his interests there to the Luttrell family, a transaction that can in reality have entailed little more than a guarantee not to oppose the Luttrell candidates and so bid up the price of votes: lavish bribery by the Luttrells was still necessary to secure their seats. When the Luttrells tired of it, the borough passed into the hands of a West Indies merchant, Joseph Foster Barham, who occupied one seat himself and later kept the second for his step-grandson, John Foster Barham. But when he, too, found himself in monetary difficulties, he sold the borough to Earl Grosvenor. He not only vacated his seat immediately to allow Grosvenor's nominee (Edward Stanley, a future Conservative Prime Minister but then a Whig) to be elected, but took the trouble to introduce Stanley to the electors. By the time of the Reform Act, Grosvenor was being accused of having countered the prevalence of bribery by a different form of corruption, having hostile voters disqualified by persuading the local overseers of the poor (his appointees) not to rate them for scot and lot, and creating new votes by finding nominal jobs for "unemployables" with the surveyor of roads.

Abolition
By the 19th century, Stockbridge was no more than a village, and had no case for survival as a constituency even had its elections been impeccably pure. In 1831, the population of the borough was 663, and contained 188 houses. It was abolished as a separate constituency by the Great Reform Act in 1832, being included within the Northern Division of the county thereafter.

 Members of Parliament 
MPs 1563–1640

MPs 1640–1832

Notes

 References 
Robert Beatson, A Chronological Register of Both Houses of Parliament (London: Longman, Hurst, Res & Orme, 1807) 
 Michael Brock, The Great Reform Act (London: Hutchinson, 1973)
D Brunton & D H Pennington, Members of the Long Parliament (London: George Allen & Unwin, 1954)
 John Cannon, Parliamentary Reform 1640-1832 (Cambridge: Cambridge University Press, 1972)Cobbett's Parliamentary history of England, from the Norman Conquest in 1066 to the year 1803 (London: Thomas Hansard, 1808) 
 Maija Jansson (ed.), Proceedings in Parliament, 1614 (House of Commons) (Philadelphia: American Philosophical Society, 1988) 
 Lewis Namier & John Brooke, The History of Parliament: The House of Commons 1754-1790 (London: HMSO, 1964)
 J. E. Neale, The Elizabethan House of Commons (London: Jonathan Cape, 1949)
 J. E. Neale, Elizabeth I and Her Parliaments 1559-1581 (London: Jonathan Cape, 1953)
 T. H. B. Oldfield, The Representative History of Great Britain and Ireland (London: Baldwin, Cradock & Joy, 1816)
 J Holladay Philbin, Parliamentary Representation 1832 - England and Wales (New Haven: Yale University Press, 1965)
 Edward Porritt and Annie G Porritt, The Unreformed House of Commons (Cambridge University Press, 1903)
Henry Stooks Smith, The Parliaments of England from 1715 to 1847 (2nd edition, edited by FWS Craig - Chichester: Parliamentary Reference Publications, 1973)
 Frederic A Youngs, jr, Guide to the Local Administrative Units of England, Vol I'' (London: Royal Historical Society, 1979)
 House of Commons Journal

Parliamentary constituencies in Hampshire (historic)
Constituencies of the Parliament of the United Kingdom established in 1563
Constituencies of the Parliament of the United Kingdom disestablished in 1832
Rotten boroughs
Stockbridge, Hampshire